John Christian Bailar Jr. (May 27, 1904 – October 17, 1991) was a professor of inorganic chemistry at the University of Illinois at Urbana-Champaign. He received his B.A. at the University of Colorado and his Ph.D. at the University of Michigan. His father was a member of the chemistry staff of the Colorado School of Mines. 

At the University of Illinois, he developed an active research program on coordination chemistry. He is referred to as the “Father of Coordination Chemistry in the United States,” as prior to his time, this area of chemistry received little attention in the U.S. The Bailar twist in coordination compounds is named after him. He helped found the book series Inorganic Syntheses and the journal Inorganic Chemistry. His work was widely recognized culminating in the award of the Priestley Medal from the American Chemical Society, an organization of which he was also president. He was the father of two sons, one of whom was John Christian Bailar III.

References

20th-century American chemists
1904 births
1991 deaths
University of Colorado alumni
University of Michigan College of Literature, Science, and the Arts alumni
University of Illinois Urbana-Champaign faculty
Presidents of the American Chemical Society
Inorganic chemists